Charlie's Family is the third LP release by the industrial music group Download. It was initially released through Download's 1996 tour in a limited run of 2,000 copies, though it was later re-issued as a digipak through Metropolis Records in 1997. Due to this limited-edition status, this is technically considered their second LP release.

Track listing
 "Beautiful" – 4:34
 "Gristle Dog Corr" – 6:12
 "Trick or Treat" – 4:18
 "Fill Her" – 5:07
 "Tweeter Blower" – 4:46
 "Catblower" – 8:35
 "Yes" – 4:04
 "Interlude" – 5:00
 "Thank You" – 5:09

Personnel
Dwayne Goettel
Philth
cEvin Key

Notes
Released as a companion album to Jim Van Bebber's film of the same name (the title was later changed to The Manson Family). However, only slight portions were used in the finished film.

References

1996 albums
Download (band) albums